(E,E)-2,4-Decadienal is an aromatic substance found in butter, cooked beef, fish, potato chips, roasted peanut, buckwheat and wheat bread crumb.
In an isolated state, it smells of deep fat flavor, characteristic of chicken aroma (at 10ppm).   At lower concentration, it has the odor of citrus, orange or grapefruit.
It might be carcinogenic. It has been used as aroma in the EU, but use restrictions apply until the required data have been submitted.

References

Conjugated aldehydes